Kosmos 803 ( meaning Cosmos 803) was a satellite which was used as a target for tests of anti-satellite weapons. It was launched by the Soviet Union in 1976 as part of the Dnepropetrovsk Sputnik programme, and used as a target for Kosmos 804 and Kosmos 814, as part of the Istrebitel Sputnikov programme.

It was launched aboard a Kosmos-3M carrier rocket, from Site 132/2 at the Plesetsk Cosmodrome. The launch occurred at 13:00 UTC on 12 February 1976.

It was used for a non-destructive intercept test, with both Kosmos 804 and Kosmos 814 intercepting it before deorbiting themselves. As of 2009, it is still in orbit.

Kosmos 803 was the second of ten Lira satellites to be launched, of which all but the first were successful. It was the first Lira satellite to successfully reach orbit. Lira was derived from the earlier DS-P1-M satellite, which it replaced.

See also 

1976 in spaceflight

References 

1976 in spaceflight
Kosmos satellites
Spacecraft launched in 1976
Dnepropetrovsk Sputnik program